Don Juan Manuel Sánchez y Gutiérrez de Castro, jure uxoris Duke of Almodóvar del Río, Grandee of Spain (15 December 1850, in Jerez de la Frontera, Spain – 23 June 1906, in Madrid, Spain) was a Spanish noble and politician who served three times as Minister of State. Along with Juan Pérez-Caballero y Ferrer, he was the representative of Spain in the Algeciras Conference of 1906.

In Córdoba, the 10 February 1872, he married Genoveva de Hoces, 8th Duchess of Almodóvar del Río, thus becoming a Grandee of Spain.

|-

|-

|-

Dukes of Almodóvar del Río
Foreign ministers of Spain
1850 births
1906 deaths
Liberal Party (Spain, 1880) politicians
Grandees of Spain
Grand Crosses of the Order of Saint-Charles
Honorary Knights Grand Cross of the Royal Victorian Order